Thamarankottai (தமிழ்: தாமரங்கோட்டை) is a village in Pattukkottai Taluk in the Thanjavur district, located in the delta of the Kaveri river. It is one of the 32 villages falls under the Musugundan Nadu in the district.

Thamarankottai is the largest village in the Thanjavur district in terms of Area and population.

The village is divided into Thamarankottai North and Thamarankottai South.

Melakkadu, Kezhakkadu and Rasiangadu are the hamlets of Thamarankottai North, while Sengapaduthankkadu, Manjavayal, Karisakkadu and Karungkulam are the hamlets of Thamarankottai South.

Mangrove forest is located in the village, its official name is Thamarankottai Reserve forest. It comes under the Muthupet Lagoon Forest.

Demography 
According to the latest national census, Thamarankottai North has a population of 6,031, of which 2,872 are males and 3,159 are females. in 1,460 households across the three hamlets of Keezakadu, Melakkadu, and Rasiangadu. Thamarankottai South has 4,499 people (2,156 males and 2,343 females) in 1,110 households across the four hamlets of Manjavayal, Sengapaduthankadu, Karungulam, Karisakadu, and Mankanangadu.

References

External links 
 Thamarankottai website (in Tamil)

Villages in Thanjavur district